Karl Buresch (12 October 1878 – 16 September 1936) was a lawyer, Christian-Social politician and Chancellor of Austria during the First Republic.

Life
Buresch was born the son of a merchant in Groß-Enzersdorf, Lower Austria, where he attended primary school (Volksschule). After finishing secondary school in Döbling, he studied law at the University of Vienna, receiving his degree in 1901. Buresch worked for a firm of solicitors in his home town, became a Christian Social member of the Groß-Enzersdorf council in 1909 and in 1916 the town's mayor, a position he held until 1919. In 1919 he was an elected member of the Austrian Constitutional Assembly (in German Mitglied der Konstituierenden Nationalversammlung). During the 1920s and early 1930s he was a delegate to the National Council parliament (1920-1934), Landeshauptmann governor of Lower Austria (1922-1931 and again 1932-1933), and a chairman of the Christian-Social group.

Upon the collapse of the biggest Austrian bank Creditanstalt in May 1931, difficulties created by the Great Depression and the instability of the national currency, the First Republic found itself in political turmoil. On 20 June 1931 Buresch was appointed Chancellor of Austria and finally managed to form a cabinet of Christian Social and German nationalist politicians, after unsuccessful attempts by his predecessors Otto Ender and Ignaz Seipel to cope with the crisis. As the commercial crisis continued and domestic policies deteriorated after a failed Heimwehr putsch led by Walter Pfrimer, Buresch lost his German nationalist allies and went on to govern with a minority cabinet from January 1932. During his mandate, which lasted to 20 May 1932, a number of austerity measures were introduced. His government was succeeded by a cabinet formed by Engelbert Dollfuß.

Buresch again assumed the office of Lower Austrian governor, before on 16 May 1933 he joined the Dollfuß cabinet as Minister of Finance. On 17 October 1935 he was succeeded by Ludwig Draxler. Until his sudden death in 1936, Buresch served as governor of the Österreichische Postsparkasse (postal savings bank) in Vienna.

References 
 Wiener Zeitung Online Dossiers

External link

1878 births
1936 deaths
People from Gänserndorf District
Austrian people of Czech descent
Austrian Roman Catholics
Christian Social Party (Austria) politicians
Chancellors of Austria
Finance Ministers of Austria
Foreign ministers of Austria
Members of the Constituent National Assembly (Austria)
Members of the National Council (Austria)
Governors of Lower Austria (after 1918)
20th-century Chancellors of Austria